Tinodon is an extinct genus of mammal alive 155–140.2 million years ago (Oxfordian-Berriasian) which has been found in the Morrison Formation (United States), the Alcobaça Formation (Portugal) and the Lulworth Formation (England). It is of uncertain affinities, being most recently recovered as closer to therians than eutriconodonts but less so than allotherians. Two species are known: T. bellus (Marsh, 1879) and T. micron (Ensom & Sigogneau-Russell, 2000).

See also

 Prehistoric mammal
 List of prehistoric mammals
 Paleobiota of the Morrison Formation

References

Morrison mammals
Taxa named by Othniel Charles Marsh
Fossil taxa described in 1879
Prehistoric mammal genera